Anhonee may refer to:

 Anhonee (1952 film), a 1952 Hindi film starring Nargis and Raj Kapoor
 Anhonee (1973 film), a 1973 Hindi film directed by Ravi Tandon

See also

Antonee